The 1979 Calgary Stampeders finished in 2nd place in the Western Conference with a 12–4 record. They appeared in the Western Final where they lost to the Edmonton Eskimos. This would mark the last season in which the Stampeders won a playoff game until 1991; they were the only CFL team during the 1980s that did not win a single playoff game.

Roster

Regular season

Season Standings

Season schedule

Playoffs

West Semi-Final

West Final

Awards and records

1979 CFL All-Stars
SB – Willie Armstead, CFL All-Star
OT – Lloyd Fairbanks, CFL All-Star
DE – Reggie Lewis, CFL All-Star
DB – Al Burleson, CFL All-Star

References

Calgary Stampeders seasons
1979 Canadian Football League season by team